Dreamtime Return (1988) is a double album by the American ambient musician Steve Roach, based on Australian Aboriginal culture and the concept of the Dreamtime. Described as "one of the pivotal works of ambient music" and "groundbreaking," the album has been included on a number of lists of the world's best music, including 1,000 Recordings to Hear Before You Die.

Overview 
Roach had already begun composing this album when by chance he received a letter from writer/photographer David Stahl. Stahl had heard Steve Roach’s third album, Structures from Silence, on the radio while driving through the desert towards Mexico. He informed Steve Roach of his current documentary film project Art of the Dreamtime. Several months later Roach and Stahl traveled to Northern Australia to visit that region's ancient Aboriginal sites.

The earliest recorded track on the album is “The Other Side”. This piece was recorded live, with Kevin Braheny playing a Steiner EWI (Electronic Woodwind Instrument). This piece was broadcast on the National Public Radio program Music from the Hearts of Space in 1986. This particular edition of the program, titled Starflight 1, was so popular that later that year it was released as an album, consequently “The Other Side” was released two years before the rest of Dreamtime Return.

Before this album was released, Steve Roach traveled to Australia for musical inspiration.

Reception 

The album has been described as a "masterpiece," "groundbreaking," "one of the pivotal works of ambient music" and "dazzlingly hypnotic." The album has also been said to "activate listeners to reach a deep level of consciousness that draws upon the trance-inducing music (Roach) has created."

Dreamtime Return helped Roach gain a worldwide reputation. The album has also been included on a number of lists of the world's best music, including 1,000 Recordings to Hear Before You Die.

After being remastered and reissued for its 30th anniversary in May 2018, Bryon Hayes from Exclaim! said "Thirty years later, in a period of intense rediscovery of barely remembered classic albums, it's fitting that this iconic gem has been uncovered."

Track listing
All tracks by Steve Roach except where noted

2-Disc CD Release

Disc one
”Towards the Dream” – 7:08
”The Continent”  – 4:49
”Songline” (Robert Rich, Roach) – 3:10
”Airtribe Meets the Dream Ghost” (Rich, Roach) – 7:00
”A Circular Ceremony” – 11:18
”The Other Side” (Kevin Braheny, Roach) – 13:14
”Magnificent Gallery” – 6:07
”Truth in Passing” – 8:41
”Australian Dawn-The Quiet Earth Cries Inside” – 6:18

Disc two
”Looking for Safety” – 31:21
”Through a Strong Eye” – 6:50
”The Ancient Day” – 6:06
”Red Twilight with the Old Ones” – 9:48
”The Return” – 8:33

1988 Fortuna Records 2-LP release
The 1988 2-LP release lacks the songs "Truth in Passing" and "Through a Strong Eye." It also has shorter edits of several other pieces, including a version of "Looking for Safety" that is 20 minutes shorter than the CD version.

Side 1
”Towards the Dream” – 7:08
”The Continent” – 4:48
”Songline” – 3:11
”Airtribe Meets the Dream Ghost” – 6:59

Side 2
”A Circular Ceremony” – 9:35
”The Other Side” – 13:13

Side 3
”Magnificent Gallery” – 5:03
”Australian Dawn-The Quiet Earth Cries Inside” – 5:11
”Looking for Safety” – 10:03

Side 4
”The Ancient Day” – 6:06
”Red Twilight with the Old Ones” – 9:48
”The Return” – 8:33

Personnel
Steve Roach – analog and digital synthesizers, sequencers, sampler, Macintosh with “M”, digital drums, Taos drum, sticks
Kevin Braheny – Steiner EWI
David Hudson – didjeridu
Chuck Oken, Jr – rainstick
Robert Rich – gourd drum, dumbek

See also
Ambient music
Electronic music
Australian Aborigine
Dreamtime (mythology)

References 

1988 albums
Steve Roach (musician) albums